The Mount Barker Football Club is an Australian rules football club located in Mount Barker, Western Australia. Nicknamed the Bulls, the club plays in the Great Southern Football League, with home games originally being hosted at Frost Oval (aka Frost Park) in Mount Barker but changed to Sounness Park in 2015.

Club history

During the early 1990s both the North and South Mount Barker Football Clubs were not performing well.  Two teams in a small town stretched the limited number of players.  Members of the North Mount Barker Football Club (the Demons) approached the South Mount Barker Hawks with the proposal that both teams amalgamate to make a stronger team for the town.  Talks broke down and in 1993 the Demons were wound up and the Mount Barker Football Club was formed.  The Hawks stayed on as a team but their coach and a number of players joined the newly founded Bulls.

As of 2015, home games will be played at Sounness Park, Mount Barker.

Honourboard

League

Reserves

Colts

Under 17s

Under 16s

Women's

Records and Achievements

Records
Highest Score: 34.22 (226) v. Albany (Round 3, 2012)

Lowest Score: 0.3 (3) v. Railways (Round 8, 2007)

Highest winning margin: 193 points - 32.13 (205) v. 1.6 (12) against Denmark/Walpole (Round 2, 2002)

Premierships

League: 1:
1996

Reserves: 2:
1999, 2011, 2020

Colts: 1:
1997

Under 17's: 1:
2015

Other GSFL Awards

Kleemann Medalists (GSFL League Fairest & Best)
1997 - Steven Mead2011 - Sam Lehmann

League Leading Goalkicker
2004 - Brett Greeney (48)
2009 - Ben Saunders (41)

2019 - Dionne Woods (42)

Charlie Punch Medal (GSFL Reserves Fairest & Best)
2007 - Tynan Coffey

2017 - Ryan Ballard

Warrick Proudlove Medal (GSFL Colts Fairest & Best) 
2015 - Kenneth Farmer

2019 - Arthur Jones

Reserves Leading Goalkicker
2008 - Paul Anning (24)

Rod Gillies Medal (GSFL Colts Fairest & Best)
1997 - Shane Thompson

Colts Leading Goalkicker
2008 - Ben Saunders (68)

Harry Reeves Colts Best & Fairest - Great Southern Carnival
2006 - Luke McPartland

AFL Players

AFL player Aaron Sandilands (Fremantle) started his football career playing for the Bulls Under 17s.
Former Essendon and Sydney player Merv Neagle has coached and played for the Bulls.

WAFL Players

Five former Bulls players currently are listed as players in the WAFL in 2018 and one is an assistant coach.

 Ben Saunders played league and reserves for South Fremantle in 2018.
 Russell Wynne played league and reserves for East Fremantle in 2018.
 Cameron Quenby and Jordon Reid played reserves for Claremont in 2018.
 Aidin Williss is listed in Claremont's playing roster but has yet to play a game for league or reserves.
 Shane Thompson (former player and coach) is an assistant coach at East Fremantle.

Former MBFC players Dale Ballantyne and Justin Parsons have played for Claremont Football Club.

References

Australian rules football clubs in Western Australia